A Thousand Memories is the debut album of American country music artist Rhett Akins. It was released in 1995 (see 1995 in country music) on Decca Records Nashville.

Content
The album produced four chart singles on the Billboard country charts in "What They're Talkin' About" at number 35), "I Brake for Brunettes" at number 36, "That Ain't My Truck" at number 3, and "She Said Yes" at number 17.

Akins co-wrote all the tracks on this album except for "Katy Brought My Guitar Back Today", which was previously recorded by Alabama on their 1994 album Cheap Seats.

Critical reception
Giving it 2 stars out of 5, Chris Dickinson of New Country described "What They're Talkin' About" as a "guilty pleasure" and compared it to Rick Springfield's "Jessie's Girl". He thought that Akins "has a knack for this sort of thing, but his ballads are harder to buy" due to his "youngish delivery". Entertainment Weekly reviewer Alanna Nash rated it C+, saying that Akins was "not quite ready for prime time" due to his age, and that his "life experience rarely goes beyond falling in love in the back of a Ford".

Track listing

Personnel
As listed in liner notes.
Rhett Akins – lead vocals, background vocals
Barry Beckett – keyboards
Mike Brignardello – bass guitar
Glen Duncan – fiddle, mandolin
Paul Franklin – steel guitar, Dobro
B. James Lowry – acoustic guitar
Mac McAnally – background vocals
Steve Nathan – keyboards
Brent Rowan – electric guitar
John Wesley Ryles – background vocals
Ricky Skaggs – background vocals
Harry Stinson – background vocals
Biff Watson – acoustic guitar
Lonnie Wilson – drums
Curtis "Mr. Harmony" Young – background vocals

Strings performed by the Nashville String Machine; Carl Gorodetzky, concertmaster.

String arrangement on "Katy Brought My Guitar Back Today" by Charles Cochran.

Strings on "Those Hands" and "She Said Yes" conducted and arranged by Bergen White.

Chart performance

References

External links
[ A Thousand Memories] at Allmusic

1995 debut albums
Rhett Akins albums
Decca Records albums
Albums produced by Mark Wright (record producer)